The Uncle is a 1965 British drama film directed by Desmond Davis and starring Rupert Davies.

Premise
Seven-year-old Gus (Robert Duncan) faces trouble when his difficult seven-year-old nephew Tom (Christopher Arris) arrives to spend the summer holidays with his family.

Cast
 Rupert Davies as David Morton
 Brenda Bruce as Addie Morton
 Robert Duncan as Gus Morton
 Ann Lynn as Sally Morton
 Christopher Ariss as Tom
 Maurice Denham as Mr. Ream
 Helen Fraser as Mary Ream
 Barbara Leake as Emma
 John Moulder-Brown as Jamie
 Jane Ratcliffe as Susie

Critical reception
The Spinning Image called the film "a little gem deserving of a wider audience."

References

External links

1965 films
1965 drama films
British black-and-white films
British drama films
Films based on American novels
Films directed by Desmond Davis
Films scored by John Addison
1960s English-language films
1960s British films